Marley Williams (born 22 July 1993) is a former professional Australian rules footballer who played for the North Melbourne Football Club and the Collingwood Football Club in the Australian Football League (AFL). He previously played for the Collingwood Football Club  he was recruited by Collingwood in the 2012 Rookie Draft, with pick #35. Williams made his debut in Round 9, 2012, against  at Football Park.

Following the retirement of Ben Johnson in 2013, at the beginning of 2014 Johnson presented Williams with his number 26 guernsey, reenacting Gavin Brown's presentation of the guernsey to Johnson in 2001. At the conclusion of the 2016 season, he was traded to North Melbourne. On 5 July Williams extended his contract with North Melbourne until the end of the 2020 season.

Personal life

In February 2014, Williams was convicted of grievous bodily harm for breaking a man's jaw outside a nightclub in Albany, Western Australia. He was sentenced in April 2014 and was given a suspended sentence.

Statistics
 Statistics are correct to the end of the 2016 season

|- style="background-color: #EAEAEA"
! scope="row" style="text-align:center" | 2012
|
| 46 || 6 || 1 || 0 || 52 || 21 || 73 || 16 || 18 || 0.2 || 0.0 || 8.7 || 3.5 || 12.2 || 2.7 || 3.0
|-
! scope="row" style="text-align:center" | 2013
|
| 46 || 16 || 2 || 4 || 181 || 89 || 270 || 68 || 52 || 0.1 || 0.3 || 11.3 || 5.6 || 16.9 || 4.3 || 3.3
|- style="background-color: #EAEAEA"
! scope="row" style="text-align:center" | 2014
|
| 26 || 15 || 1 || 3 || 174 || 88 || 262 || 58 || 33 || 0.1 || 0.2 || 11.6 || 5.9 || 17.5 || 3.9 || 2.2
|-
! scope="row" style="text-align:center" | 2015
|
| 26 || 20 || 2 || 2 || 246 || 180 || 426 || 75 || 53 || 0.1 || 0.1 || 12.3 || 9.0 || 21.3 || 3.8 || 2.7

|- style="background-color: #EAEAEA"
! scope="row" style="text-align:center" | 2016
|
| 26 || 11 || 0 || 0 || 88 || 83 || 171 || 34 || 22 || 0.0 || 0.0 || 8.0 || 7.5 || 15.5 || 3.1 || 2.0
|- class="sortbottom"
! colspan=3| Career
! 68
! 6
! 9
! 741
! 461
! 1202
! 251
! 178
! 0.1
! 0.1
! 10.9
! 6.8
! 17.7
! 3.7
! 2.6
|}

References

http://www.nmfc.com.au/player-profile/marley-williams
http://www.nmfc.com.au/news/2017-07-05/williams-extends-contract

External links

1993 births
Living people
Australian people of New Zealand descent
People from Albany, Western Australia
Australian rules footballers from Western Australia
North Albany Football Club players
Claremont Football Club players
Collingwood Football Club players
North Melbourne Football Club players
Australian people of Māori descent